The Grange Fair is an annual fair and camping event held in Centre Hall in Centre County, Pennsylvania each year since 1874.

The fair is typically held in the last full week of August. On the last day of 140th Grange Fair, it was announced that the 2015 Grange Fair will be moving a week earlier and adding 1 day, with the fair going from 7 days to 9 days. No fairs were held in 1917–18, 1942–45 nor 2020.

The 2005 Emmy awarding winning documentary film The Grange Fair: An American Tradition directed by Joe Myers chronicles the 131st Grange Fair.

Attractions 
The Centre County Grange Fair is most notable for allowing fairgoers to camp on the grounds, but the fair also has carnival rides, many types of food stands, bingo, and live concerts. As a county fair, it hosts animal shows, livestock contests, and 4H competitions, as well as the judging of such things as baked goods, canned goods, quilts, vegetables, photography, etc.

Camping 
Camping at Grange Fair takes place in two forms: tenting and camping in recreational vehicles (referred to solely as camping).  

It consists of thousands of people camping at the fairgrounds in large, green, blue, or tan rented canvas tents with asphalt floors. Thousands more stay in their own recreational vehicles, parked on the grounds. Most recreational vehicles are parked in rented locations that offer electric and plumbing hookups, but there are additional spaces available on a first-come-first-serve basis for a nightly fee. However these "overflow camping" spots do not have electric or plumbing hookups. 

While tenters rent in the same asphalt pad ("tent spot") from year to year, the tents themselves are not assigned in any way so tenters receive different tents each year. The roughly 1000 tents are erected over the proceeding weeks by prisoners on work release from the nearby SCI Benner. Each tent is approximately 14 feet by 14 feet with a single 4 outlet electrical box in one corner. Because tent spots do not have running water, there are public water spigots with free potable water and public bathrooms in multiple locations. Tenters may pay once to have an extension added to the front and/or back of their asphalt pad. These extensions have set dimensions and tenters are responsible for devising a manner to cover their extensions. Tenters may not alter their tents or asphalt pads in any way.

Tent locations are often passed down through generations. After the space for the tents reached maximum capacity, a wait list was started. The wait list was cancelled after 3 decades when it exceeded 500 families, some of which waited 27 years. Fairgoers can no longer apply for a tent. Both tenters and campers may lose their location for rule violations or for passing up their location for 2 fairs. A single person (or couple) may not rent both a tent and a camper spot.

Historically, those renting tents would move in on Wednesday with those renting spaces with campers move in starting as early as the Sunday before the fair opened officially on Thursday. Since 2015, the official tenter move-in date is Thursday, coinciding with the first day of the fair. Tenters are permitted to enter the grounds on Sunday to put up their tent extensions and move in any large furniture. Campers may sleep in their recreational vehicles prior to the start of the fair, but tenters may not stay in their tents until their official move-in day.

References

External links

http://newspaperads.centredaily.com/SS/Page.aspx?&secid=50878&pagenum=1&facing=false
http://www.visitpa.com/visitpa/event.pa?id=18467121
https://www.centredaily.com/living/article42824670.html
https://www.nytimes.com/1994/09/01/garden/same-tent-same-joy-every-year.html?exprod=permalink&partner=permalink
Seven Wonders of Centre County - Grange Fair
Centre County History - Grange Fair starts 1874

Festivals in Pennsylvania
Recurring events established in 1874
Tourist attractions in Centre County, Pennsylvania